Search Committee, 2022 is a committee set up by President Abdul Hamid on 5 February 2022, to select qualified persons for the post of Chief Election Commissioner and other Election Commissioners of the 13th Bangladesh Election Commission. Obaidul Hassan is the chairman of this committee with 6 members. Although two such committees have been formed in Bangladesh before, this is the first committee formed by law. One week before the formation of this committee, the Chief Election Commissioner and Other Election Commissioners Appointment Act, 2022 was passed. The ruling Awami League welcomed this committee. However, 15 political parties, including the main opposition party BNP and Islami Andolan Bangladesh, refrain from being involved in all the activities of the committee. President Abdul Hamid formed Habibul Awal commission on 26 February with the recommendations of the committee.

Background

Members
President Abdul Hamid formed a search committee headed by Justice Obaidul Hasan of the Appellate Division of the Bangladesh Supreme Court.Justice SM Khuddus Zaman of the High Court Division, Sohrab Hossain, Chairman of the Public Service Commission, and Muslim Chowdhury, Auditor General and Controller of Bangladesh, were appointed as members of the search committee.President Abdul Hamid also nominated former Election Commissioner Sohul Hossain and eminent novelist Anwara Syed Haque as members of the search committee.

Reaction

References

Election Commission of Bangladesh